The U-15 European Baseball Championship, formerly the European Youth Baseball Championship or European Baseball Championship Cadets, is an international baseball tournament sanctioned and created by the Confederation of European Baseball (CEB). In 2012, the maximum age for players was lowered from 16 to 15 years old.

Results

Medal table

See also
 European Baseball Championship
 European Junior Baseball Championship

References

 
WBSC Europe competitions
Under-15 sport
European championships